Raúl Manuel Grijalva (born February 19, 1948) is an American politician and activist who has served as the United States representative for  from 2003 to 2023 and  from 2023 present. He is a member of the Democratic Party. The district, numbered as the 7th from 2003 to 2013, includes the western third of Tucson, part of Yuma and Nogales, and some peripheral parts of metro Phoenix. Grijalva is the dean of Arizona's congressional delegation.

Early life, education and career
Raúl Grijalva's father was a migrant worker from Mexico who entered the United States in 1945 through the Bracero Program and labored on southern Arizona ranches. Grijalva was born on Canoa Ranch, 30 miles south of Tucson. He graduated from Sunnyside High School in 1967 and is a 2004 inductee to the Sunnyside High School Alumni Hall of Fame. He attended the University of Arizona and earned a bachelor's degree in sociology.

Grijalva was an Arizona leader of the Raza Unida Party. According to Armando Navarro's history of the party, "Grijalva was so militant that he alienated some members of Tucson's Mexican-American community. After losing in his first bid for elective office, a 1972 run for a seat on the school board, he began to cultivate a less radical image."

In 1974, Grijalva was elected to the Tucson Unified School District board and served until 1986. Grijalva Elementary School in Tucson was named for him in 1987. From 1975 to 1986, Grijalva was the director of the El Pueblo Neighborhood Center, and in 1987 he was Assistant Dean for Hispanic Student Affairs at the University of Arizona. Grijalva was a member of the Pima County Board of Supervisors from 1989 to 2002, and served as chair from 2000 to 2002. He resigned as a supervisor in 2002 to run for Congress.

U.S. House of Representatives

Tenure

114th Congress (2015–17)
In 2015, Grijalva settled a complaint accusing him of drunkenness and a "hostile workplace environment" with a female staffer who had been at her job for three months. The $48,000 payment was made from House of Representatives funds.

116th Congress (2019–2021) 
For his tenure as the chair of the House Natural Resources Committee in the 116th Congress, Grijalva earned an "A" grade from the nonpartisan Lugar Center's Congressional Oversight Hearing Index.

In 2019, Grijalva was the subject of an Ethics Committee probe relating to his alcoholism and creating a "hostile workplace". He has repeatedly come under fire for alcohol use, but has denied alcoholism.

117th Congress (2021–23)
Grijalva was at the U.S. Capitol on January 6, 2021, to certify the 2020 presidential electoral college votes when the Capitol was attacked by Donald Trump supporters. Moments after Grijalva finished speaking in support of certifying Arizona's votes, insurrectionists started banging on the doors of the House chambers. He called the attack "one of the darkest and most shameful days of our republic" and the perpetrators "domestic terrorists". Grijalva blamed President Donald Trump for inciting the attack and called for the 25th Amendment to be invoked to remove Trump from office. After the 25th Amendment was not invoked, Grijalva supported impeaching Trump a second time. He voted to impeach Trump again on January 13, 2021.

In February, Grijalva voted in support of the American Rescue Plan, which included a nationwide $15 federal minimum wage increase. The increase was removed from the bill by the Senate Parliamentarian. As a result, Grijalva joined a group of progressive Democrats in calling to overturn the Parliamentarian's ruling.

As of October 2021, Grijalva had voted in line with Joe Biden's stated position 100% of the time.

Committee assignments
 Committee on Education and Labor
 Subcommittee on Early Childhood, Elementary and Secondary Education
 Subcommittee on Higher Education and Workforce Investment
 Committee on Natural Resources (Ranking Member since 2023)
 Subcommittee on Water, Oceans and Wildlife

Caucus memberships
Grijalva is a member of several dozen caucuses. A full list is available at his website.
 Congressional Progressive Caucus
 Congressional Hispanic Caucus
 LGBT Equality Caucus (vice chair)
 Congressional Arts Caucus
 Congressional NextGen 9-1-1 Caucus
 Medicare for All Caucus
 Blue Collar Caucus
 House Pro-Choice Caucus

Political positions

Grijalva formerly co-chaired the Congressional Progressive Caucus with Mark Pocan, having been replaced by Pramila Jayapal after stepping down in order to chair the House Committee on Natural Resources. In 2008, he was among 12 members rated by National Journal as tied for most liberal overall. On the ideological map of all House members at GovTrack's website, Grijalva is ranked farthest to the left. Liberal and progressive activist groups routinely give him high marks for his voting record. Grijalva has received a 100% score from Americans for Democratic Action, Peace Action, the League of Conservation Voters, the Leadership Conference on Civil and Human Rights, NARAL Pro-Choice America, Arab American Institute, and several other notable groups. At the start of the 114th Congress, Grijalva became the ranking member of the House Committee on Natural Resources.

Grijalva is an advocate of mining law reform and many other environmental causes. From his position on the House Committee on Natural Resources—where he has been the top Democrat on the Subcommittee on National Parks, Forests and Public Lands since 2007—he has led Democratic efforts to strengthen federal offshore oil drilling oversight since before the 2010 Deepwater Horizon oil spill and introduced a successful bill to create a permanent National Landscape Conservation System at the Bureau of Land Management. He was a leading candidate for Secretary of the Interior when President Barack Obama was elected, but the job eventually went to Ken Salazar; according to The Washington Post, Obama made the decision in part because of Grijalva's stated preference for more environmental analysis before approving offshore drilling projects.

Grijalva has been a vocal opponent of Arizona's SB 1070 law, which mandates police checks of citizenship documentation for anyone subjected to a legitimate law enforcement stop, detention or arrest as long as the officer does not consider race, color or national origin during the stop, detention or arrest. Shortly after Arizona Governor Jan Brewer signed the measure, Grijalva called on legal, political, activist and business groups not to hold their conventions or conferences in Arizona, a position he said quickly became misconstrued as a call for a general boycott of Arizona's economy. In response, the Arizona Republican Party handed out bumper stickers reading "Boycott Grijalva, Not Arizona". After a federal judge stopped implementation of most of SB 1070, Grijalva withdrew the boycott, saying that he had reacted to it "very personally". In an interview, he said, "to all of a sudden have a law that separates me from the whole I found very offensive and demeaning."

Grijalva criticized the 2010 deployment of 1,200 National Guard troops to the U.S.–Mexico border as "political symbolism" that he believed would not adequately address the issues of immigration and border security.

Grijalva often called for a withdrawal of troops from Afghanistan and Iraq, and supports the wider implementation of the National Solidarity Program as a way to improve Afghans' economic and educational infrastructure. The group Iraq and Afghanistan Veterans of America gave him an "A" rating for the 2007–08 Congressional session.

Abortion
Grijalva has a pro-choice voting record and voted against the Partial-Birth Abortion Ban Act. He was strongly critical of the Stupak-Pitts Amendment, which sought to place limits on taxpayer-funded abortions in the Affordable Health Care for America Act. Grijalva opposed the 2022 overturning of Roe v. Wade, calling it "about control" and "mostly men forcing women to carry a child against their will.  It is about trapping women in our society in cycles of poverty, so that they cannot easily rise to challenge these men who fear their success."

Budget proposals
As co-chair of the Congressional Progressive Caucus, Grijalva took a leading role in shaping CPC "alternative budgets"—budget bills offered by various groups and caucuses in Congress other than the official majority or minority party plan. In 2011 the CPC introduced what it called the People's Budget, which reached budget balance in 10 years according to an assessment by the Economic Policy Institute based on nonpartisan government data. The proposal was noted approvingly by some of the world's leading economists, including Jeffrey Sachs—who called it "a bolt of hope ... humane, responsible, and most of all sensible"—and Paul Krugman, who called it "genuinely courageous" for achieving budget balance "without dismantling the legacy of the New Deal".

In 2012, again with Grijalva as co-chair, the Progressive Caucus introduced the Budget for All, which is similar to the People's Budget and includes several new features, including a novel proposal to institute a small personal wealth tax above $10 million in net worth phased in over a period of five years. The proposal received 78 votes, all from Democrats, when the House considered it on March 29, 2012.

Deepwater Horizon and oil rig safety
On February 24, 2010, Grijalva wrote a letter signed by 18 other representatives calling for an investigation of the BP Atlantis offshore drilling platform due to whistleblower allegations that it was operating without approved safety documents. He has called for Atlantis to be shut down. Since the Deepwater Horizon oil spill on April 20, 2010, Grijalva has written letters to the Minerals Management Service and the Department of the Interior questioning current offshore drilling regulations and calling for stronger oversight of the oil industry.

Grijalva has gained prominence as an outspoken critic of what he calls lax federal oversight of the oil drilling industry, and in late 2010 launched an investigation of the White House's handling of the Horizon spill and its aftermath. That investigation revealed that scientists at the Environmental Protection Agency and elsewhere in the federal government had voiced concerns about drafts of an official government report on the cause and scope of the spill, but were overruled because the report was meant as a "communications document".

In 2010, Grijalva introduced H.R. 5355 to eliminate the cap on oil company liability for the cost of environmental cleanups of spills.

Education
Grijalva has sponsored numerous education bills, including the Success in the Middle Act and the Graduation for All Act. He has longstanding ties to the educational community from his time on the board of the Tucson Unified School District and his current position on the House Education and the Workforce Committee.

Environment
As a member and chair of the Pima County Board of Supervisors, Grijalva was widely regarded as a central figure behind the Sonoran Desert Conservation Plan, an ambitious county program for planned land-use and biodiversity conservation. He consistently supported endangered species and wilderness conservation on the Board of Supervisors and has continued to do so in Congress, introducing a bill in 2009 to make permanent the National Landscape Conservation System within the Bureau of Land Management. In 2008, Grijalva released a report, The Bush Administration's Assaults on Our National Parks, Forests and Public Lands, that accused the Bush administration of mismanaging public land and reducing barriers to commercial access.

The Trump administration proposed changes to "the way it enforces the Endangered Species Act" in 2018. Among other things, the proposal would facilitate delisting endangered species and "streamline interagency consultations". A ranking member of the House Natural Resources Committee at the time, Grijalva called the proposal "a favor to industry" and said the administration "doesn't seem to know any other way to handle the environment" than "as an obstacle to industry profits".

Foreign policy
In 2011, Grijalva and Representatives Barbara Lee, Mike Honda, and Lynn Woolsey criticized Obama for failing to seek congressional authorization for military intervention in Libya, and was one of the 70 Democrats to vote to defund the Libyan war. In 2013, he opposed intervening in Syria.

On April 25, 2018, 57 U.S. representatives, including Grijalva, released a condemnation of Holocaust distortion in Poland and Ukraine. They criticized Poland's new Holocaust law, which would criminalize accusing Poland of complicity in the Holocaust, and Ukraine's 2015 memory laws glorifying Ukrainian Insurgent Army (UPA) and its leaders, such as Roman Shukhevych.

In July 2019, Grijalva voted against a House resolution condemning the Global Boycott, Divestment, and Sanctions Movement targeting Israel. The resolution passed 398–17.

In 2021, Grijalva was one of eight Democrats to vote against the funding of the Iron Dome in Israel.

Fossil fuel industry funding of climate change studies
On February 24, 2015, as the ranking Democratic member of the United States House Committee on Natural Resources, Grijalva sent letters to seven institutions employing scientists who disagree with most other climate scientists on manmade climate change. The letters requested information on any funding from fossil fuel companies as well as copies of all emails about the content of their congressional testimony. One of the recipients, University of Colorado Professor Roger Pielke Jr., responded that he had already testified to Grijalva's committee that he has received no funding from fossil fuel interests, and characterized the letter as part of a politically motivated "witch-hunt".

The heads of some mainstream scientific organizations criticized Grijalva's letters. Margaret Leinen, the president of the American Geophysical Union, posted on her AGU blog that in requiring information of only a few scientists, based only on their scientific views, Grivalja's action was contrary to academic freedom: "We view the singling out of any individual or group of scientists by any entity – governmental, corporate or other – based solely on their interpretations of scientific research as a threat to that freedom." The executive director of the American Meteorological Society wrote to Grijalva that his action "sends a chilling message to all academic researchers" and "impinges on the free pursuit of ideas that is central to the concept of academic freedom".

In response to criticism that requesting communications was counter to principles of academic freedom, Grijalva said he was willing to eliminate that part of the request.

Gun control
Grijalva supports increasing restrictions on the purchase and possession of guns and increasing enforcement of existing restrictions on gun purchase and possession. He was one of the 67 co-sponsors of the 2007 Assault Weapons Ban, HR 1022. Grijalva has an F rating from the NRA.

Health care 
As co-chair of the Progressive Caucus, Grijalva was a prominent supporter of a public option throughout the debate over the Patient Protection and Affordable Care Act. The House-approved Affordable Health Care for America Act included a public option, but the Senate version did not, and it was ultimately not a part of the final package. Grijalva has largely been supportive of the ACA since its passage and argued the Supreme Court should not overturn it during a segment with Representative Peter Roskam, who opposed the law, on the PBS NewsHour on March 28, 2012.

Grijalva has a long history in community health activism as an early supporter of Tucson's El Rio Community Health Center. He supports single-payer health care, but voted for the ACA because he felt it was a major improvement over the status quo.

Immigration 
Grijalva supports the DREAM Act and the Comprehensive Immigration Reform for America's Security and Prosperity Act (CIR ASAP) and has come to prominence because of his role in promoting immigration reform. He opposed the expansion of a border fence, citing cost effectiveness concerns and potential damage to sensitive wildlife habitats. The CIR ASAP bill includes his Border Security and Responsibility Act of 2009, which prioritizes remote cameras and other border monitoring techniques with a relatively slight environmental impact. The Immigrant Justice Advocacy Campaign gave him a 100% score for the first session of the 111th Congress. In previous years he voted against H.R. 4437 and the Secure Fence Act, and opposed Arizona Proposition 200 in 2004.

Grijalva has criticized armed civilian groups that patrol the Mexican border, accusing them of racism, and has reportedly used demeaning language to describe them. In return, some supporters of the armed patrols have called him "MEChA boy" in retaliation.

On July 26, 2019, Grijalva, whose district runs along the U.S.–Mexico border, called Trump's emergency declaration a "pathetic attempt to circumvent Congress".

Native Americans 
Grijalva supports sovereignty and government-to-government relationships. In April 2010 he introduced the RESPECT Act, which mandates that federal agencies consult with Native tribes before taking a variety of major actions. The bill would codify a Clinton-era executive order that has never had the force of law.

SB 1070 and the boycott controversy 
After the passage in April 2010 of Arizona's controversial SB 1070 law, which Grijalva saw as opening the door to racial profiling and granting traditionally federal immigration enforcement powers to local authorities, he suggested that civic, religious, labor, Latino, and other like-minded organizations refrain from using Arizona as a convention site until the law was repealed. His opposition to SB 1070 and his suggestion of a boycott of Arizona were widely viewed as the reason for multiple subsequent death threats against him and his staff, which led to several office closures in 2010.

When Judge Susan Bolton of the Arizona District Court enjoined major parts of the law in July 2010, Grijalva ended his call for economic sanctions. As he told the Arizona Daily Star, the largest paper in Tucson:

He subsequently said that his economic strategy was not as effective as he hoped in changing other state lawmakers' minds, and that he would focus on legal remedies in the future. The issue became a focal point in the 2010 election, in which Grijalva defeated Republican challenger Ruth McClung by less than 10,000 votes.

Presidential election objections 
Concerned about allegations of voting irregularities purportedly leading to disenfranchisement, in 2004 Grijalva joined Representative Eddie Bernice Johnson and several other House Democrats in requesting that the United Nations observe and certify elections in the United States. After the general election, Grijalva was one of 31 representatives to vote not to count Ohio's electoral votes. President George W. Bush won Ohio by 118,457 votes. Without Ohio's electoral votes, the election would have been decided by the U.S. House of Representatives, with each state having one vote in accordance with the Twelfth Amendment to the United States Constitution.

Grijalva objected to North Carolina's electoral votes in the 2016 presidential election, which Donald Trump won by over 150,000 votes. Because no senator joined his objection, it was dismissed.

Giffords shooting 

After the shooting of Gabby Giffords, Grijalva called it a consequence of the violent rhetoric that had been used by Tea Party members. He singled out Sarah Palin's rhetoric as "contributing to this toxic climate" and said she needed to monitor her words and actions.

Political campaigns
After the 2000 United States Census, Arizona gained two Congressional districts. The 2nd district, which had long been represented by Mo Udall, was renumbered as the 7th district. Ed Pastor, a Phoenix Democrat who succeeded Udall in 1991, had his home drawn into the newly created 4th district and opted to run for election there, making the 7th district an open seat. Grijalva won a crowded seven-way Democratic primary, which was tantamount to election in this heavily Democratic, majority-Hispanic district. Before the 2010 election, he was reelected three times with no substantial Republican opposition. In 2008, he defeated Republican challenger Joseph Sweeney.

During the 2008 presidential primary campaign, Grijalva endorsed Obama for president, but Hillary Clinton won his district.

During the 2010 midterms, Grijalva faced his toughest reelection campaign yet, against Republican Ruth McClung. It was reported that although Grijalva had decades of experience and McClung had none, and although there were twice as many Democrats in the district as there were Republicans, the two candidates were neck-and-neck in the polls. The main reason was Grijalva's call for a boycott of Arizona in response to the state's new immigration law, SB 1070. Grijalva won, 50–44%, his smallest margin of victory since being elected, and the first close election in what is now the 7th since 1978, when Udall was held to 52% of the vote.

Grijalva's district was renumbered as the 3rd district after the 2010 census, and made somewhat more Democratic than its predecessor even though it lost some of its share of Tucson to the 2nd district (the reconfigured 8th). Co-chair of the Congressional Progressive Caucus, Grijalva broke from many of his colleagues and announced his support for Democratic presidential candidate Bernie Sanders on October 9, 2015, at a rally for Sanders in Tucson.

Electoral history

Personal life
Grijalva and his wife, Ramona, have three daughters, including Tucson Unified School District board member Adelita Grijalva, who was reelected to the post in 2018. Grijalva identifies as Catholic. On August 1, 2020, he tested positive for COVID-19.

Grijalva is a hiker and a fan of the University of Arizona's basketball team.

See also 
 List of Hispanic and Latino Americans in the United States Congress

References

Further reading
 Videos of Grijalva discussing various issues Tucson Citizen, March 22, 2006
 A Report on the Bush Administration Assaults On Our National Parks, Forests and Public Lands, October 22, 2008
 Rep. Raul Grijalva, Vows to Bring Public Option to House Floor – video report by Democracy Now!, October 30, 2009
 Rep. Raul Grijalva: New Deployment of National Guard to US–Mexico Border Is Election-Year "Political Symbolism", May 28, 2010

External links

 Congressman Raul Grijalva official U.S. House website
 Grijalva for Congress campaign website 
 
 
 

|-

|-

|-

|-

|-

1948 births
21st-century American politicians
American Roman Catholics
American politicians of Mexican descent
Democratic Party members of the United States House of Representatives from Arizona
Hispanic and Latino American members of the United States Congress
Living people
Politicians from Tucson, Arizona
University of Arizona alumni
University of Arizona faculty
American gun control activists
Catholics from Arizona